The 1921 Mercer Baptists football team was an American football team that represented  Mercer University as a member of the Southern Intercollegiate Athletic Association (SIAA) during the 1921 college football season. In their second season under head coach Josh Cody, Mercer compiled a 3–6 record.

Schedule

References

Mercer
Mercer Bears football seasons
Mercer Baptists football